The Thief and the Fallen is the eighth studio album by American Philadelphia-based underground hip hop duo Jedi Mind Tricks. It was released on June 2, 2015 through Enemy Soil Entertainment. Production was handled entirely by Stoupe the Enemy of Mankind, who had left the band before their 2011 album Violence Begets Violence. It features guest appearances from Yes Alexander, Eamon, A-F-R-O, Dilated Peoples, Lawrence Arnell, R.A. the Rugged Man and Thea Alana. The album peaked at number 105 on the Billboard 200, at number 11 on both Top R&B/Hip-Hop Albums and Independent Albums charts, at number 10 on both Top Rap Albums and Tastemakers charts, and at number one on the Heatseekers Albums chart in the United States.

Background 
In March 2015, Jedi Mind Tricks founders Vinnie Paz and Stoupe the Enemy of Mankind announced they had reunited to make their first album together since 2008's A History of Violence. Former member Jus Allah, who rejoined the group in 2006 but then left again in 2013, did not appear on the album, making it the first Jedi Mind Tricks album in which he did not appear since 2006's Servants in Heaven, Kings in Hell. On May 6, 2015, the duo released a single and music video for "Deathless Light", along with a release date and cover art. Vinnie Paz's lyrics on the album were partly inspired by the written works of British author Clive Barker. The album cover was designed by Andrew Haines, and was intended to be unlike other hip hop albums.

Track listing

Sample credits
 Track 7 contains a sample of "Io Di Notte" written by Albano Carrisi and Alessandro Colombini
 Track 11 contains a sample of "Aphasia" written and performed by The Budos Band

Charts

References

External links

2015 albums
Jedi Mind Tricks albums
Enemy Soil Records albums